The following list includes players from the North Queensland Cowboys that have represented state and national sides while at the club and the years that they achieved their honours. Representatives are included if they were contracted to the Cowboys at the time of their representation. This includes the Cowboys under-20 team or contracted players who were playing for the Mackay Cutters, Northern Pride, Townsville Blackhawks or North Queensland Young Guns, as they are/were feeder clubs.

International

Australia
    Steve Walters (1997, Super League)
    Matt Sing (2003–05)
    Matthew Bowen (2004)
    Luke O'Donnell (2005–06)
    Johnathan Thurston (2006–09, 2011–17)
    Carl Webb (2008)
    Matthew Scott  (2010–16)
    Willie Tonga (2010–11)
    James Tamou (2012–16)
    Brent Tate (2013)
    Michael Morgan (2016–17)
    Justin O'Neill (2016)
    Jordan McLean (2018)
    Reuben Cotter (2022)
    Valentine Holmes (2022)
    Jeremiah Nanai (2022)
    Murray Taulagi (2022)

Fiji
    Noa Nadruku (1998–99)
    Ashton Sims (2013)
    Tariq Sims (2013)
    Viliame Kikau (2015)
    Taniela Sadrugu (2022)

France
   Clint Greenshields (2013)

Greece
    George Gatis (2005)

Ireland
    Rory Kostjasyn (2013)

Italy
    Paul Pensini (1999)
    Paul Dezolt (2003)
    Daniel Sorbello (2004)
    Joel Riethmuller (2011, 2013)

New Zealand
    John Lomax (1997–98)
    Tyran Smith (1997)
    Brian Jellick (1999–00)
    Paul Rauhihi (2003–05)
    David Faiumu (2005–07)
    Kalifa Faifai Loa (2011)
    Jason Taumalolo (2014, 2016–17)
    Te Maire Martin (2017–18)
    Peta Hiku (2022)

Papua New Guinea
    Bruce Mamando (2000)
    Tyson Martin (2009)
    Ray Thompson (2013, 2015)
    Kurt Baptiste (2019)
    Daniel Russell (2019)

Samoa
    Robert Piva (1995)
    Malo Solomona (2006)
    Alex Elisala (2013)
    Kalifa Faifai Loa (2013)
    Antonio Winterstein (2013–14, 2016)
    Tautau Moga (2014–15)
    John Asiata (2016–17)
    Hamiso Tabuai-Fidow (2022)

Scotland
    Geoff Bell (2000)
    Kane Linnett (2013, 2016)
    Lachlan Coote (2016)

Tonga
    Jason Taumalolo (2013, 2017–19, 22)
    Patrick Kaufusi (2016–17)
    John Asiata (2019)

Wales
    Jonathan Davies (1995)
    Kevin Ellis (1995)

International 9s

Australia
    Kyle Feldt (2019)

Lebanon
    Jacob Kiraz (2019)

Papua New Guinea
    Daniel Russell (2019)

Tonga
    John Asiata (2019)
    Jason Taumalolo (2019)

State of Origin

Queensland
    Owen Cunningham (1997, Super League)
    Steve Walters (1997, Super League)
    Paul Green (1999–00)
    Paul Bowman (2000–01, 2003–05)
    Julian O'Neill (2000)
    John Buttigieg (2001–02)
    John Doyle (2001–02)
    Nathan Fien (2001)
    Matthew Bowen (2003–07)
    Matt Sing (2003–05)
    Josh Hannay (2003, 2006)
    Travis Norton (2004)
    Johnathan Thurston (2005–17)
    Carl Webb (2005–08)
    Ty Williams (2005)
    Jacob Lillyman (2006–08)
    Matthew Scott (2006, 2009–16)
    Willie Tonga (2009–11)
    Brent Tate (2012–13)
    Michael Morgan (2015–19)
    Justin O'Neill (2016–17)
    Gavin Cooper (2016–18)
    Coen Hess (2017–18, 2020)
    Josh McGuire (2019)
    Valentine Holmes (2020-22)
    Kyle Feldt (2021)
    Francis Molo (2021)
    Hamiso Tabuai-Fidow (2021)
    Reuben Cotter (2022)
    Jeremiah Nanai (2022)
    Murray Taulagi (2022)
    Tom Dearden (2022)
    Tom Gilbert (2022)

New South Wales
    Ian Roberts (1997, Super League)
    Tim Brasher (2000)
    Luke O'Donnell (2006, 2009–10)
    James Tamou (2012–16)

All Stars Game

Indigenous All Stars
    Johnathan Thurston (2010–13, 2015, 2017)
    Carl Webb (2010)
    Ty Williams (2010)
    Matthew Bowen (2011–2012)
    Cory Paterson (2012)
    Ray Thompson (2015)
    Reuben Cotter (2021)

Maori All Stars
     Daejarn Asi (2021)
     Wiremu Greig (2021)
     Esan Marsters (2020–2021)
     Emry Pere (2021)

NRL/World All Stars
    Luke O'Donnell (2010)
    Matthew Scott (2011)
    Aaron Payne (2012)
    James Tamou (2013)
    Jason Taumalolo (2015)
    Antonio Winterstein (2015)
    Matthew Wright (2016)
    Gavin Cooper (2017)

City vs Country Origin

NSW Country
    Glenn Morrison (2001, 2003–04)
    Mitchell Sargent (2006)
    Ray Cashmere (2008)
    Ben Harris (2008)
    Willie Mason (2010)
    Tariq Sims (2012–14)
    Rory Kostjasyn (2016)
    Kane Linnett (2016)

NSW City
    Luke O'Donnell (2005, 2009–10)

Other honours

Prime Minister's XIII
    Matthew Bowen (2005, 2011)
    Johnathan Thurston (2006, 2009)
    Luke O'Donnell (2006, 2008–09)
    Shane Tronc (2006)
    Carl Webb (2008)
    Matthew Scott (2009)
    Gavin Cooper (2013)
    Michael Morgan (2014)
    Jake Clifford (2018)
    Jordan McLean (2018)
    Enari Tuala (2018)
    Kyle Feldt (2019)

PNG Prime Minister's XIII
    Tyson Martin (2009)
    James Segeyaro (2011)
    Ray Thompson (2011)
    Kyle Laybutt (2018)

Indigenous Dreamtime Team
    Carl Webb (2008)
    Ty Williams (2008)

Aborigines
    John Buttigieg (1999)
    John Doyle (1999)

New Zealand Māori
    James Tamou (2010)
    Arana Taumata (2010)

Queensland Residents
 Jason Barsley (2005–06)
 Scott Bolton (2006, 2008)
 Mark Dalle Cort (2006)
 Shane Muspratt (2006–07)
 Dayne Weston (2009)
 Clint Amos (2010)
 Donald Malone (2010)
 Joel Riethmuller (2011)
 Sam Hoare (2013)
 Curtis Rona (2013)
 Javid Bowen (2014–15)
 Kyle Feldt (2015)
 Patrick Kaufusi (2015)
 Hezron Murgha (2015)
 Ben Spina (2015)
 Jahrome Hughes (2016)
 Corey Jensen (2017)
 Kyle Laybutt (2017)
 Tom Gilbert (2019)

Junior Representatives

Junior Kangaroos
    Kyle Feldt (2011)
    Mosese Pangai (2011)
    Chris Grevsmuhl (2012)
    Coen Hess (2015–16)
    Enari Tuala (2017–18)
    Jake Clifford (2018)
    Murray Taulagi (2018)

Junior Kiwis
    Jason Taumalolo (2010–12)
    Michael Parker-Walshe (2011)
    Wayne Ulugia (2011)
    Braden Uele (2015)
    Brandon Smith (2016)
    Peter Hola (2018)
    Sean Mullany (2018)
    Emry Pere (2018)
    Griffin Neame (2019)

Queensland U20 Origin
    Alex Elisala (2012)
    Chris Grevsmuhl (2012–13)
    Patrick Kaufusi (2013)
    Zac Santo (2013)
    Coen Hess (2015)
    Conor Carey (2015)
    Gideon Gela-Mosby (2015–16)
    Cooper Bambling (2016)
    Marcus Jensen (2016)
    Bacho Salam (2016)
    Darryn Schonig (2016)
    Mitchell Dunn (2017)
    Corey Horsburgh (2017)
    Hiale Slade-Roycroft (2017)
    Jake Clifford (2018)
    Murray Taulagi (2018-19)
    Kurt Wiltshire (2018)
    Elijah Anderson (2019)
    Nathan Barrett (2019)
    Logan Bayliss-Brow (2019)
    Ben Condon (2019)
    Tom Gilbert (2019)

Representative Coaching Staff

International
Greece
    Steve Georgallis (Head Coach – 2022)

Papua New Guinea Women
    Ben Jeffries (Head Coach – 2022)

Tonga
    Murray Hurst (Head Coach – 1998–00)
    Dean Young (Assistant Coach – 2022)

United States
    Terry Matterson (Head Coach – 2013)

State Of Origin
Queensland
    Neil Henry (Assistant Coach – 2006, 2009)

New South Wales
    Graham Murray (Head Coach – 2006–07)

All Stars Game
Indigenous All Stars
    Neil Henry (Head Coach – 2010)

City-Country Origin
NSW Country
    Graham Murray (Head Coach – 2002)

NSW City
    Graham Murray (Coach – 2003–05)

North Queensland Cowboys
Rugby league representative players lists